Arrifana is a civil parish in the municipality of Guarda, Portugal. The population in 2011 was 661, in an area of 15.82 km2.

References

Freguesias of Guarda, Portugal